The Slovakia women's national football team represents Slovakia in international women's association football.

History

Czechoslovakia
The team debuted as Czechoslovakia in 1968 against Italy and lost 1–2. Later on, Czechoslovakia became a major force in women's football and first took part in the qualifying for the European Championships in 1989. They finished second in their qualifying group and reached the quarter-finals, where they lost in two legs (1–1 home, 0–2 away) against West Germany. Czechoslovakia also took part in qualifying for the European Championships in 1991. They finished one point behind Hungary and went to a play-off. Czechoslovakia's third and final qualifying phase for the European Championships in 1993 ended in a second place finish behind Italy.

Slovakia
Slovakia made their debut in a friendly match against the Czech Republic on 21 June 1993. Slovakia lost 0–6. Slovakia made their competitive debut under their own name in the following qualifying, for the 1995 European Championships. Slovakia finished in second place, and therefore were classed by UEFA as between a Class A team, who were seeded, and class B, who had to play a playoff with class A.

Slovakia therefore had to play a playoff for the 1997 European Championships. The team finished last, and were relegated to Class B. Slovakia remained in Class B until the qualifying for the 2007 Women's Football World Cup, when classification was abolished, both for the European Championships and the World Cup. At the qualifying for 2009, Slovakia therefore had their first chance to qualify for a championship. Slovakia had to play in the first round, but won this game. In the second round, Slovakia lost, to Portugal.

Team image

Nicknames
The Slovakia women's national football team has been known or nicknamed as the "Repre" or "Slovenskí sokoli (falcons)".

Results and fixtures
 The following is a list of match results in the last 12 months, as well as any future matches that have been scheduled.

Legend

2022

 2023 

Coaching staff

Current coaching staff

Manager history

* Peter Kopún (?–present)

Players

Current squad
 The following players were named for the match against Sweden on 30 November 2021.
 Caps and goals accurate up to and including 10 June 2021.

Recent call ups
 The following players have been called up to the Slovakia squad in the past 12 months.

Records

 Active players in bold, statistics correct as of 2020.

Most capped players

Top goalscorers

Competitive record
FIFA Women's World Cup*Draws include knockout matches decided on penalty kicks.UEFA Women's Championship*Draws include knockout matches decided on penalty kicks.''

See also
 Slovakia national football team

References

External links
Official website
FIFA profile

 
National
European women's national association football teams
1993 establishments in Slovakia